The Inspector Alleyn Mysteries is a British detective television series, broadcast on BBC1, which was adapted from nine of the novels by Dame Ngaio Marsh, featuring the character Chief Inspector Roderick Alleyn. The pilot episode was shown in 1990, with Simon Williams playing the part of Alleyn. Two series followed in 1993 and 1994, with Patrick Malahide replacing Williams in the title role.

Premise
In the pilot episode, the character of Alleyn was played by Simon Williams. William Simons was cast as Alleyn's right-hand man and "Dr Watson", Detective Inspector Fox, and Belinda Lang starred as painter Agatha Troy, Alleyn's love interest.  When a full series finally came to screen three years later, Simon Williams was unavailable, and the role of Alleyn was filled by Patrick Malahide, while Simons and Lang reprised their roles. Over the course of two series, eight episodes were broadcast, each focusing on a separate novel in the series. Both Malahide series were released on DVD in 2007, via Acorn Media. In 2011, Acorn acquired the rights to the pilot, and in 2012, issued a repackaged version of the set containing the Williams pilot. This set was also released in Australia. Unlike the original novels, whose first story takes place as early as 1934, after World War I, the pilot and thus all subsequent episodes take place after World War II, with "Artists in Crime" being set in late 1948.

Cast
 Simon Williams as Chief Inspector Roderick Alleyn (pilot only)
 Patrick Malahide as Chief Inspector Roderick Alleyn
 William Simons as Inspector Fox
 Belinda Lang as Agatha Troy
 Tim Dutton as D.S. Bailey
 Sandy Welch as D.C. Robinson
 Leslie Schofield as A.C.C. Connors
 Mark Penfold as Doctor Curtis

Episodes

Pilot (1990)

Series 1 (1993)

Series 2 (1994)

References

External links
 

1990 British television series debuts
1994 British television series endings
1990s British drama television series
Television shows based on British novels
British detective television series
1990s British crime television series
BBC mystery television shows
English-language television shows
1990s British mystery television series